Cameron Nichol (born 26 June 1987 in Roehampton, London Borough of Wandsworth, England) is a British rower educated at Milfield School and University College London, University of London.

Rowing career
Nichol was part of the British squad that topped the medal table at the 2011 World Rowing Championships in Bled, where he won a silver medal as part of the eight with Nathaniel Reilly-O'Donnell, James Foad, Alex Partridge, Moe Sbihi, Greg Searle, Tom Ransley, Daniel Ritchie and Phelan Hill.

Rowing achievements

Olympic Games
2012 2012 London – Team GB, Men's Spare Pair

World Championships
2010 2010 Karapiro – Silver, Men's Eight
2011 2011 Bled – Silver, Men's Eight

World Cups
2012 Lucerne – 7th, Men's Pair
2012 Munich – 9th, Men's Pair
2011 Munich – Silver, Eight
2011 Lucerne – Bronze, Eight
2010 Munich – 5th, Men's Pair
2010 Lucerne – 9th, Men's Pair
2010 Bled – 8th, Men's Pair
2008 Lucerne – 13th, Men's Four
2007 Amsterdam – 13th, Men's Four

World U23 Championships
2007 Glasgow – Bronze, Coxless Four
2008 Beetzsee – 6th

European Rowing Championships
2007 Poznan – 5th, Men's Eight

Henley Royal Regatta
2011 Henley Royal Regatta – Finalist, Grand Challenge Cup
2010 Henley Royal Regatta – Semi-Finalist, Goblet's & Nickall's Challenge Cup
2008 Henley Royal Regatta – Semi-Finalist, Steward's Challenge Cup
2007 Henley Royal Regatta – Winner, Prince Albert Challenge Cup
2006 Henley Royal Regatta – Finalist, Men's Student Coxed Four

Personal life 
Following the 2012 London Olympics, Nichol returned to medical school and started an online rowing training program called RowingWOD.

References

External links
 Cameron Nichol at British Rowing (archived)
 
 RowingWOD

1987 births
Living people
People from Roehampton
English male rowers
British male rowers
World Rowing Championships medalists for Great Britain
Alumni of University College London